SS Italia was a French passenger steamship that was built as a civilian ship in 1904, requisitioned by the French Navy in the First World War as an armed boarding steamer, and sunk by an Austro-Hungarian Navy U-boat in 1917.

Building
The Compagnie Française de Navigation et de Construction Naval built Italia in Nantes, completing her in 1904. She had two screws, each driven by a three-cylinder triple-expansion engine.

Italias owner was the Compagnie Marseillaise de Navigation à Vapeur, and her managers were Fraissinet et Compagnie. They registered her at Marseille. Her code letters were JPKF. By 1914 Italia was equipped for wireless telegraphy. Her call sign was FRI.

First World War
In the First World War the French Navy requisitioned Italia and had her converted into an armed boarding steamer. On 30 May 1917 the Austro-Hungarian U-boat  sank her by torpedo in the Mediterranean Sea, south of the Strait of Otranto and 46 miles southeast of Santa Maria di Leuca, Italy.

References

Bibliography

1904 ships
Maritime incidents in 1917
Passenger ships of France
Ships built in France
Ships sunk by Austro-Hungarian submarines
Steamships of France
World War I naval ships of France
World War I shipwrecks in the Mediterranean Sea